Abu Seman bin Haji Yusop (born 10 January 1944) was the Member of Parliament of Malaysia for the Masjid Tanah constituency in the state of Melaka from 2004 to 2013. A member of the United Malays National Organisation (UMNO) party in the then-governing Barisan Nasional coalition, he served in the deputy ministry of successive governments during that period.

Before entering politics, Abu Seman was a lawyer with his own firm. He is a former police inspector and prosecutor.

Political career
Abu Seman was elected to federal Parliament in the 2004 general election for the seat of Masjid Tanah. He was subsequently appointed as a Parliamentary Secretary, and in 2009 was appointed as the Deputy Minister of Home Affairs by the newly installed Prime Minister Najib Razak. His ministerial and parliamentary career came to an end in 2013, when he was not selected to recontest his seat for Barisan Nasional.

Election results

Honours

Honours of Malaysia
  :
  Officer of the Order of the Defender of the Realm (KMN) (1998)
  Commander of the Order of Loyalty to the Crown of Malaysia (PSM) - Tan Sri (2016)

  :
  Grand Commander of the Order of the Territorial Crown (SMW) - Datuk Seri (2015)
  :
  Companion Class I of the Order of Malacca (DMSM) - Datuk (1994)
  Knight Commander of the Order of Malacca (DCSM) - Datuk Wira (1998)

References

Living people
1944 births
Officers of the Order of the Defender of the Realm
People from Malacca
Members of the Dewan Rakyat
21st-century Malaysian politicians
United Malays National Organisation politicians
20th-century Malaysian lawyers
Malaysian people of Malay descent
Malaysian Muslims
Commanders of the Order of Loyalty to the Crown of Malaysia
Malaysian police officers